Mathieu Babillot (born 9 September 1993) is a French rugby union player. His usual position is as a flanker, and he currently plays for Castres Olympique in the Top 14 and the France national team.

International career
Babillot was called up to the French national team again ahead of France's third 2018 Six Nations Championship match against Italy.

Honours

Club 
 Castres
Top 14: 2017–18

References

External links
Castres profile
ESPN Profile

1993 births
Living people
French rugby union players
Castres Olympique players
Sportspeople from Chartres
Rugby union flankers
France international rugby union players